Cattleya mossiae (literally 'Moss' Cattleya'), commonly known as the Easter orchid, is a species of labiate Cattleya orchid.  The white-flowered form is sometimes known as Cattleya wagneri.  The diploid chromosome number of C. mossiae has been determined as 2n = 40. The haploid chromosome number has been determined as n = 20.

It is among the group of very fragrant orchids.

References

External links

mossiae
mossiae
National symbols of Venezuela